The Desert Spear is a fantasy novel written by American writer Peter V. Brett. It is the second book in the demon cycle series. It was released on March 7, 2010.

Reception
The novel entered at no. 35 in the New York Times Hardcover Fiction Best Seller List in April 2010. It has ranked in the top 15 of The Times Hardback Fiction Bestseller List since its release in April.

Sequels
The third volume, entitled The Daylight War, was released February 12, 2013. Following the events of The Desert Spear, the books main characters must fight against an army of demons. According to Brett, The Daylight War precedes two more planned novels (in addition to novellas) in the series, making it a quintet.

Film adaptation
It has been confirmed that the Demon Cycle has been optioned for film production by the major Hollywood director Paul W. S. Anderson and longtime producing partner Jeremy Bolt, the duo behind the Resident Evil film franchise.

References

External links
 Author's website

2010 novels
British fantasy novels
HarperCollins books